Amissi Tambwe (born 10 October 1988) is a Burundian football striker who plays for Singida Big Stars.

References

1988 births
Living people
Burundian footballers
Burundi international footballers
Aigle Noir AC players
Vital'O F.C. players
Simba S.C. players
Young Africans S.C. players
Fanja SC players
Association football forwards
Burundian expatriate footballers
Expatriate footballers in Tanzania
Burundian expatriate sportspeople in Tanzania
Expatriate footballers in Oman
Burundian expatriate sportspeople in Oman
Tanzanian Premier League players